Dormagen Chempark station is a station in the town of Dormagen in the German state of North Rhine-Westphalia. Chemiepark Dormagen is the location of a large Bayer works. The station is on the Lower Left Rhine Railway and it is classified by Deutsche Bahn as a category 6 station. The station was opened briefly during World War I as Hackenbroich. It was reopened in 1948 and was renamed Dormagen Bayerwerk between 1954 and 1957. It was renamed Dormagen Chempark on 15 December 2013.

The station is served by line S 11 of the Rhine-Ruhr S-Bahn, running between Düsseldorf Airport and Bergisch Gladbach every 20 minutes during the day.

See also  
 Leverkusen Chempark station
 Krefeld-Hohenbudberg Chempark station

References

Rhine-Ruhr S-Bahn stations
S11 (Rhine-Ruhr S-Bahn)
Railway stations in Germany opened in 1948
Buildings and structures in Rhein-Kreis Neuss